Cordichelys is an extinct genus of podocnemidid turtle. It was around during the Eocene. Fossils of this turtle have been discovered at Wadi El Hitan as of November 2020.

References

Podocnemididae
Prehistoric turtle genera
Extinct turtles